Cyclanthus a genus  of plants in the family Cyclanthaceae, first described as a genus in 1824. It is native to tropical Latin America and the West Indies. It consists of large, palm-like monocots.

 Species
 Cyclanthus bipartitus Poit. ex A.Rich. - southern Mexico, Central America, Trinidad, Windward Islands, northern South America (Venezuela, the Guianas, Colombia, Ecuador, Peru, Bolivia, northwestern Brazil)
 Cyclanthus indivisus R.E.Schult. - Panama, Colombia

References

Cyclanthaceae
Pandanales genera